Abhay Prashal Indoor Stadium  is an indoor stadium located in Indore, Madhya Pradesh. The stadium was constructed on 3.5 acres of land allotted by the Government of Madhya Pradesh for events of Table Tennis, Badminton etc. The stadium has a seating capacity of 10,000 and was inaugurated by Arjun Singh the then Chief Minister of Madhya Pradesh in December 1994. The venue hosts several political events, music events and sports events like badminton, basketball, lawn tennis.

In 2012, Abhay Prashal was chosen as  ITTF Hot Spots Training Centre in India and only centre in the South Asian Region.

References

External links 

 
 Wikimapia

Sports venues in Indore
Sports venues completed in 1994
1994 establishments in Madhya Pradesh
Indoor arenas in India
20th-century architecture in India